XHUAM-FM, known as UAM Radio, is the radio station of the Universidad Autónoma Metropolitana, established in 2011.

History

Single-frequency network
UAM Radio originally broadcast on 94.1 FM from five 20-watt transmitters at various UAM facilities, each of which is located at a different UAM facility in Mexico City:

XHUAMR-FM at the General Rectory, which houses the studio facilities 
XHUAMA-FM at the Unidad Azcapotzalco
XHUAMC-FM at the Unidad Cuajimalpa
XHUAMI-FM at the Unidad Iztapalapa
XHUAMX-FM at the Unidad Xochimilco

It is estimated that the transmitter network covered 70% of Mexico City.

The permits for these stations were awarded by Cofetel on January 27, 2010. The network signed on March 11, 2011, bringing the 94.1 FM frequency back to use in Mexico City for the first time since the closure of XHFM-FM in 1957.

Conversion to a single transmitter
In July 2017, the Federal Telecommunications Institute authorized UAM Radio to begin using one transmitter, from the Cuajimalpa site, using the callsign XHUAM-FM and with a power increase to 3,000 watts, expanding reception to eastern portions of the State of Mexico. The university sought the change because its single-frequency network was "not sufficient to provide an efficient FM radio service to Mexico City".

Testing began for the higher-power transmissions from Cuajimalpa in March 2018.

Format
The format is largely cultural in nature. Some programs utilize UAM resources and are produced by departments at the various UAM units.

References

University radio stations in Mexico
Radio stations established in 2011
Radio stations in Mexico City